Apodemia is a New World genus of metalmark butterflies found from Canada to Brazil.

Species
Apodemia contains the following species:
Apodemia arnacis (Stichel, 1928)
Apodemia ares (Edwards, 1882)
Apodemia chisosensis Freeman, 1964 – Chisos metalmark
Apodemia duryi (Edwards, 1882) – Mexican metalmark
Apodemia hepburni Godman & Salvin, 1886 – Hepburn's metalmark
Apodemia hypoglauca (Godman & Salvin, 1878) – falcate metalmark
Apodemia mejicanus (Behr, 1865) – Sonoran metalmark or Mexican metalmark
Apodemia mormo (C. & R. Felder, 1859) – Mormon metalmark (type species)
Apodemia multiplaga Schaus, 1902 – narrow-winged metalmark
Apodemia murphyi Austin, 1988 – Murphy's metalmark
Apodemia nais (Edwards, 1876) – nais metalmark
Apodemia palmeri (Edwards, 1870) – Palmer's metalmark or gray metalmark
Apodemia planeca R. de la Maza & J. de la Maza, 2017
Apodemia selvatica R. de la Maza & J. de la Maza, 2017
Apodemia virgulti (Behr, 1865) – Behr's metalmark
Apodemia walkeri Godman & Salvin, 1886 – Walker's metalmark
Apodemia zela (Butler, 1870)

References

 
Riodininae
Riodinidae of South America
Butterfly genera
Taxa named by Baron Cajetan von Felder
Taxa named by Rudolf Felder